1,1-Bis(diphenylphosphino)ferrocene, commonly abbreviated dppf, is an organophosphorus compound commonly used as a ligand in homogeneous catalysis. It contains a ferrocene moiety in its backbone, and is related to other bridged diphosphines such as 1,2-bis(diphenylphosphino)ethane (dppe).

Preparation
This compound is commercially available. It may be prepared by treating dilithioferrocene with chlorodiphenylphosphine:
Fe(CHLi) + 2 ClPPh → Fe(CHPPh) + 2 LiCl

The dilithiation of ferrocene is easily achieved with n-butyllithium in the presence of TMEDA. Many related ligands can be made in this way. The Fe center is typically not involved in the behavior of the ligand.

Reactions
Dppf readily forms metal complexes. The palladium derivative, (dppf)PdCl, which is popular for palladium-catalyzed coupling reactions, is prepared by treating dppf with the acetonitrile or benzonitrile adducts of palladium dichloride: Substitution of the phenyl substituents in dppf leads to derivatives with modified donor-acceptor properties at the phosphorus atoms.

dppf + PdCl(RCN) → (dppf)PdCl + 2 RCN (RCN = acetonitrile or benzonitrile)

Another example of dppf in homogeneous catalysis is provided by the air- and moisture-stable Ni(II) precatalyst [(dppf)Ni(cinnamyl)Cl.  It promotes Suzuki-Miyuara cross-coupling of heteroaryl boronic acids with nitrogen- and sulfur-containing heteroaryl halides. 
]

Another dppf-based catalyst is (dppf)Ni(o-tolyl)Cl, can be prepared from ligand exchange with (PPh3)2Ni(o-tolyl)Cl. It promotes the amination of aryl chlorides, sulfamates, mesylates, and triflates.

See also
 Diphosphines
 borrowing hydrogen catalysis

References

Ferrocenes
Tertiary phosphines
Diphosphines